Richard Hayes may refer to:
Richard J. Hayes (1902–1976), Irish World War II code breaker, & Director of National Library of Ireland
Richard Hayes (professor) (born 1945), professor of Buddhist philosophy
Richard Hayes (politician) (1878–1958), Irish politician, historian, film censor and medical doctor
Richard Hayes (biotech policy advocate), visiting scholar, University of California at Berkeley College of Natural Resources / Energy and Resources Group
Richard Hayes (singer) (1930–2014), singer best known for his version of The Old Master Painter
Richard Hayes (pilot), New Zealand helicopter pilot
Richard Hayes (general), U.S. Army general
Richard Hayes (priest) (died 1938), Dean of Derry
Rick Hayes (politician), American politician in Connecticut

See also
Rick Hayes-Roth (born 1947), professor in information sciences
Richard Hays (disambiguation)
Richard Hay (disambiguation)